Sally Yee (born April 10, 2001) is a Fijian table tennis player who represented Fiji at the 2020 Summer Olympics. She also competed in the 2016 Summer Olympics in the women's singles event. She won 3 silver medals and a bronze at the 2019 Pacific Games.

Career
Fiji entered her into the table tennis competition at the 2016 Summer Olympic Games for the first time in the nation's Olympic history. She secured a spot in the women's singles by virtue of her top three finish at the 2016 Oceania Qualification Tournament in Bendigo, Australia. However she was eliminated in the preliminary round after competing against Offiong Edem. In 2018, she was awarded Fiji Tattslotto Sportswomen of the year in which she dedicated her achievements to her parents and coach. In January 2021, she officially pulled out of the 2020 Tokyo Olympics due to "personal reasons". In June 2021, she pulled back and was confirmed to represent Fiji at the Olympics. She was eliminated in the preliminary round against Chelsea Edghill.

Personal life 
Sally has a sister Grace Yee, with which they competed together in the Women's doubles and team events in the 2019 Pacific Games. She attended Jai Narayan College in Fiji before moving to Japan to further her education. In Japan, she studied English at Chinzei Gakuin High School and took part in local competitions in the Nagasaki prefecture. Prior in giving birth in April 2021, Yee trained throughout her pregnancy for the 2020 Summer Olympics coached by her own mother Harvi Yee.

References

External links

 Sally Yee on Facebook
 Sally Yee on Instagram

2001 births
Living people
Fijian table tennis players
Female table tennis players
Olympic table tennis players of Fiji
Table tennis players at the 2016 Summer Olympics
Table tennis players at the 2018 Commonwealth Games
Commonwealth Games competitors for Fiji
Table tennis players at the 2020 Summer Olympics
21st-century Fijian women